The 2009 Lima Challenger was a professional tennis tournament played on outdoor red clay courts. It was the sixth edition of the tournament which was part of the 2009 ATP Challenger Tour. It took place in Lima, Peru between 16 and 22 November 2009.

ATP entrants

Seeds

 Rankings are as of November 9, 2009.

Other entrants
The following players received wildcards into the singles main draw:
  Duilio Beretta
  Francisco Carbajal
  Sergio Galdós
  Iván Miranda

The following players received entry from the qualifying draw:
  Diego Cristín
  Hans Podlipnik-Castillo
  Guillermo Rivera Aránguiz
  Cristóbal Saavedra-Corvalán

Champions

Singles

 Eduardo Schwank def.  Jorge Aguilar, 7–5, 6–4

Doubles

 Martín Alund /  Juan-Martín Aranguren def.  Cristóbal Saavedra-Corvalán /  Guillermo Rivera Aránguiz, 6–4, 6–4

External links
ITF Search 
2009 Draws

Lima Challenger
Clay court tennis tournaments
Lima Challenger
November 2009 sports events in South America
2009 in Peruvian sport